= Rapadiya =

- village
- Location within Madhya Pradesh Location within India
- Coordinates: 23.158778°N 77.511584°E
- Country: India
- State: Madhya Pradesh
- District: Bhopal
- Tehsil: Huzur

Population (2011)
  - Total: 773
- Time zone: UTC+5:30 (IST)
- ISO 3166 code: MP-IN
- Census code: 482552

Rapadiya is a village in the Bhopal district of Madhya Pradesh, India. It is located in the Huzur tehsil and the Phanda block.

== Demographics ==
According to the 2011 census of India, Rapadiya has 157 households. The effective literacy rate (i.e. the literacy rate of population excluding children aged 6 and below) is 76.08%.

Demographics (2011 Census)
	Total	Male	Female
Population	773	427	346
Children aged below 6 years	104	64	40
Scheduled caste	105	59	46
Scheduled tribe	61	39	22
Literates	509	301	208
Workers (all)	249	217	32
Main workers (total)	173	157	16
Main workers: Cultivators	96	90	6
Main workers: Agricultural labourers	26	25	1
Main workers: Household industry workers	18	14	4
Main workers: Other	33	28	5
Marginal workers (total)	76	60	16
Marginal workers: Cultivators	8	5	3
Marginal workers: Agricultural labourers	50	40	10
Marginal workers: Household industry workers	10	9	1
Marginal workers: Others	8	6	2
Non-workers	524	210	314
